Old Mother Riley, MP is a 1939 British comedy film starring Arthur Lucan and Kitty McShane, which forms part of the Old Mother Riley series of films. The film's plot centres on Old Mother Riley standing for election to the House of Commons.

Plot summary
Concerning Old Mother Riley's fight against her landlord, and as a means of defeating a corrupt politician intent on demolishing her street and the local pub along with it, Mother Riley taking to the soapbox. Local crowds cheer her on, and she finds herself  elected to Parliament, and eventually promoted to Cabinet Minister for Strange Affairs.

Cast
Old Mother Riley -	Arthur Lucan
Kitty Riley -	Kitty McShane
Jack Nelson -	Torin Thatcher
Henry Wicker -	Henry Longhurst
Archie -	Patrick Ludlow
Emperor of Rocavia -	Dennis Wyndham
Littleman -	Rex Alderman
The Supervisor -	Cynthia Stock
Brownlow -	Kenneth Henry

Critical reception
Mary Haberstroh writes in Britmovie, "“Old Mother Riley, MP” synthesizes slapstick comedy with malapropisms and everything in between to create one of the best Old Mother Riley films...Lucan is credible as Old Mother Riley wanting to seek social equality for the poor and unemployed, and Kitty McShane, Torin Thatcher, and Henry B. Longhurst turn in stellar performances in this comedy. The story itself is well written and continuous without any unexplained gaps in the plot, making it easy for the viewer to follow...The characters in the film could very well be real life figures who are trying to survive during the time of the Great Depression. “Old Mother Riley, MP” is a film that is sure to please anyone who appreciates classic British comedy."
In britishpictures.com, David Absalom writes, "by any reasonable definition, this is not a good film. But the character (Old Mother Riley) is so watchable, so wonderfully manic, you enjoy the film despite its faults."
TV Guide wrote, "graced with an insane plot...Nonsensical but full of laughs."

External links

References

1939 films
1939 comedy films
1930s political comedy films
British political comedy films
Films set in England
Films directed by Oswald Mitchell
Films set in London
British black-and-white films
Films about elections
Films scored by Percival Mackey
1930s English-language films
1930s British films